Khelma may refer to:

Khelma people
Khelma language
Khelma, Peren, Nagaland, India

Language and nationality disambiguation pages